Warszawa Zacisze Wilno railway station is a railway station in the Targówek district of Warsaw, Poland. As of 2022, it is used by Koleje Mazowieckie, which runs services to Warszawa Wileńska and Czyżew.

History
The station was built as a result of a public-private partnership with a real estate developer, who was building the nearby housing estate. The construction cost was estimated at 6.5 million zloty.

The station was opened on 9 June 2013, and was officially transferred to PKP Polskie Linie Kolejowe on 19 June 2013.

The nearby neighbourhood Zacisze was not connected to the station as a result of a disagreement between the authorities and local allotment gardeners. The connection was eventually built and opened on 26 December 2019.

References

External links

Railway stations in Poland opened in 2013
Zacisze Wilno
Railway stations served by Koleje Mazowieckie
Targówek